Air Chief Marshal  Lloyd Samuel Breadner, CB, DSC (July 14, 1894 – March 14, 1952) was a Canadian military pilot and Chief of the Air Staff during World War II.

Early career
Breadner obtained his pilot's certificate at Wright Flying School and was commissioned in the British Royal Naval Air Service on December 28, 1915. During World War I he served on the Western Front as a fighter pilot in the No. 3 (Naval) Squadron. He was promoted to Flight Lieutenant (RNAS) on 31 December 1916. He was awarded the Distinguished Service Cross on May 23, 1917. The citation read:

Squadron Commander Lloyd Breadner and 3 (Naval) Squadron were posted to RAF Walmer during the Winter of 1917/1918 .
He was released from the RAF with the rank of major in March 1919.

Command
He was commissioned promoted to Squadron Leader in 1920 and transferred to the Royal Canadian Air Force (RCAF) on its formation in 1924. He became Controller of Civil Aviation in 1922, and later commanded Camp Borden from January 15, 1924, to September 23, 1925. He was promoted to Wing Commander on April 1, 1924. After attending RAF Staff College, he was the Director of the RCAF from February 15, 1928, to April 29, 1932.  From 1932 until 1935 he commanded Trenton and then attended the Imperial Defence College. He was promoted to Group Captain on February 1, 1936, and to Air Commodore on August 4, 1938.

He became Chief of Air Staff on May 29, 1940, and having been promoted to Air Marshal on November 19, 1941, became Air Officer Commanding-in-Chief RCAF Overseas in January 1944.  Breadner was promoted on his retirement on November 25, 1945, to Air Chief Marshal, the first Canadian to hold this rank.

On November 30, 1944, while he was Chief of Air Staff, his son, Flying Officer Donald Lloyd Breadner, was killed after an air gunnery exercise, while flying a de Havilland Mosquito from RCAF Station Debert, in Nova Scotia. He was the only son of Breadner and his wife, Mary Evelyn. They also had three daughters.

Awards
May 23, 1917: Distinguished Service Cross 
January 1, 1943: Companion, Order of the Bath
October 25, 1943: Military Cross, First Class (Belgium)
August 25, 1944: Grand Officers Cross of Polonia Restituta (Poland)
October 5, 1946: Order of the White Lion, Class II (Czechoslovakia)
December 20, 1946: Legion of Merit (Degree of Commander)
September 12, 1947: Commander of the Legion of Honour (France)
June 12, 1948: King Haakon VII's Cross of Liberty (Norway)

References and notes
Notes

Citations

Bibliography

External links

Juno Beach Centre profile
The Aerodrome
Canada's 25 Most Renowned Military Leaders

|-

|-

|-

|-

1894 births
1952 deaths
Graduates of the Royal College of Defence Studies
Royal Canadian Air Force officers
Royal Naval Air Service aviators
Royal Canadian Air Force air marshals of World War II
Companions of the Order of the Bath
People from Carleton Place
Commanders of the Legion of Merit
Canadian recipients of the Distinguished Service Cross (United Kingdom)
Recipients of the Croix de guerre (Belgium)
Commandeurs of the Légion d'honneur
Recipients of the Order of Polonia Restituta
Grand Officers of the Order of the White Lion
Canadian military personnel from Ontario
Recipients of the King Haakon VII Freedom Cross
Royal Air Force officers
Royal Naval Air Service personnel of World War I
Royal Air Force personnel of World War I